Ad. Maliana or Associação Desportiva Maliana is a football club of East Timor come from Maliana, Bobonaro District. The team plays in the Taça Digicel.

References

Football clubs in East Timor
Football
Bobonaro Municipality
Association football clubs established in 2010
2010 establishments in East Timor
Maliana